Buena Vista is a former settlement in Nevada County, California,  north of Chicago Park.

History
It was situated along the Nevada County Narrow Gauge Railroad and had a station.

Buena Vista Station served for some time as the crossroad for the You Bet & Red Dog mines. Removed in 1943 as part of the reclamation and salvage operations of the former NCNGRR, the station's precise location has been found to lie in the southwest corner of what, today, is the private property of King of Games Farm. The farm's proprietor personally preserves the site.

References

Former settlements in Nevada County, California
Former populated places in California